Marghoob Ali Rahat popularly known as MA Rahat was a Pakistani writer. He died at the age of 76.
He used different pen names and wrote thousands of novels and hundreds of books on various topics for the digests.

Works
Following are his notable works:

Kali Qabar
Kamand
Kalka Devi
Firon
Devi Ki Hukoomat
Zehreela
Unchi Uraan
Kaath Ka Ullu
Nitika
Titli
Bicchoo
Aasaib
Kaali Devi Ka Mandir
Kaalay Ghaat Wali
Pazeb
Chipkali
Wadi Al-Maut
Sandal Ka Taboot
Iqbal e Jurm
Doosra Tabaq
Wehshat Zaade
Samandar Ka Beta
Baazi
Aatish
Sadiyon Ka Beta
Jaanbaaz
Muqaddas Ahd
Sarab
Jinn Zaada
Bhonchal
Pujari
Kalay Raaste
Taloot
Saaya
Nirwan Ki Talash
Sadiyon Ki Beti
Sadiyon Ka Musafir
Masoom Churail
Rampur Ka Lakshman
Khoon Asham
Gardaab
Golmaal
Apsara
The Black Temple
Sadiyon Ka Sehar
Sunehri Jonk
Anmol
Kafan Posh
Hisaar
Zinda Murda
Shehzor
Aasaib Nagri
Khud Parast
Tarsol Kund Ki Dasi
Bay Badan
Jaadugar
Barood Ke Phool
Ilzaam
Hamalia
Sarfarosh
Sookhay Gulab
Akal Sagar
Maazi Ke Jazeeray
Wehshi
Tashna Tan
Rangeen Kehkashan
Sunehri Taboot
Sholay
Dushman Roohain
Jalan
Jazbaat
Dehshat Kada
Daayan
Green Force
Bangroo
Kaainaat
Kaali Dunya
Aks
Akhri Saboot
Ajaib Khana
Baaghi
Zinda Sadiyan
Tilism Zadi
Dasht e Wehshat
Naag Devta
Neel Mehal Ki Raqasa
Band Aankhen
Jharne (unfinished) 
100 Saal Pehle
Asli Waris
Diwali
Kaalay Chiragh
Kaala Jaadu
Lawa
Tarkash
Barzakh
Daldal
Khauf
Khilaadi
Roop Kund Ki Roopa
Shamoon
Tareek Waadi
Shehteer
Aazaad Qaidi
Meetha Zehar
Muqaddas Nishan
Parchayan
Naag Nagar Ki Nageena
The Black Channel
Rooh K Shikari
Sazishon Ke Jaal
Doobte Chand Ke Pujari
Shiblees

References

1941 births
2017 deaths
Pakistani writers
Pakistani fiction writers
People from Lahore
Urdu-language writers from Pakistan